Rajendra Prakash, K.C.I.E., 48th direct male lineal descendant from the original founder of the Dynasty, served as the Maharaja of Sirmur State from 1933 until 1964.

Biography 
He was born on 11 January 1913 to Amar Prakash and his wife Mandalasa Kumari. He succeeded to the Gaddi on the death of his father in 1933. He died in 1964.

Personal life

Marriages 
In 1936, he married his first wife, Durga Devi, the daughter of the Raja Sahib of Nagod. His second marriage was with Indira Devi, the daughter of the Maharaja Thakore Sahib of Palitana in 1941.

Children 
Rajendra Prakash was the father of two daughters, Nalini Devi (by his first wife) and Padmini Devi (by his second wife). Nalini Devi married Vidur Singh, son of the Raja Sahib of Alipura, in 1952. Padmini Devi, married Bhawani Singh, son of the Maharaja Sahib of Jaipur, in 1967.

References 

British India